Robin Söderqvist (born September 27, 1994) is a Swedish ice hockey player. He is currently playing with IK Oskarshamn of the Swedish Hockey League (SHL).

Söderqvist made his Swedish Hockey League debut playing with Frölunda HC during the 2013–14 season.

References

External links

1994 births
Frölunda HC players
IK Oskarshamn players
Living people
Ice hockey people from Gothenburg
Swedish ice hockey forwards
IF Troja/Ljungby players
Växjö Lakers players